SS America was an ocean liner and cruise ship built in the United States in 1940, for the United States Lines and designed by the noted American naval architect William Francis Gibbs. It carried many names in the 54 years between its construction and its 1994 wreck: SS America (carrying this name three different times during its career); troop transport USS West Point; and SS Australis, Italis, Noga, Alferdoss, and American Star. It served most notably in passenger service as America and the Greek-flagged Australis.

It was wrecked as the American Star at Playa de Garcey on Fuerteventura in the Canary Islands on 18 January 1994. The wreck deteriorated and completely collapsed into the sea. As of 2022, it is no longer visible on the ocean surface and has become an artificial reef.

Construction (1936–1939) 

America was laid down under the first Maritime Commission contract on 22 August 1938 at Newport News, Virginia by the Newport News Shipbuilding and Drydock Company.

It was one of only a few ocean liners, American or otherwise, to have had its interiors designed by women—the New York firm Smyth, Urquhart & Marckwald. The ornate decor typical of liners of the past was forgone, in favor of a more contemporary and informal design.

The aim was to provide an atmosphere of cheerfulness and sophisticated charm.

America was launched on 31 August 1939 and was sponsored by Eleanor Roosevelt, wife of then-president of the United States Franklin D. Roosevelt. Her cousin, Kermit Roosevelt, was one of the founders of United States Lines. The liner entered service on 10 August 1940, undertaking its maiden voyage as the flagship of the United States Lines.

Early career (1939–1941)

As originally designed, America could carry 543 in cabin class, 418 in tourist class, 241 in third class, and 643 crew. The interior accommodations were styled by architects Eggers & Higgins to be the utmost in contemporary American design, making use of stainless steel, ceramics, and synthetics.

America was originally constructed with low funnels in order to give the ship a modern, streamlined appearance. Very early in its career, however, the height of the funnels was increased by 16 feet, due to heavy soot deposits on the decks. The forward funnel was in actuality a dummy, housing the horn and certain ventilation uptakes.

Due to conflict having begun in Europe in World War II, in which the United States was still neutral, the ship's name, along with "United States Lines" and two American flags were painted in large size to be clearly visible on both sides of the hull.

At night, it sailed while fully illuminated, as further precaution. Additionally, it did not immediately take to its intended North Atlantic service route, instead sailing in safer waters. It was, however, quietly fitted with a degaussing cable for protection against naval mines on 3 January 1941.

On 28 May 1941, America was called up to service by the United States Navy, while the ship was at Saint Thomas in the United States Virgin Islands. It was ordered to return to Newport News to be handed over to the Navy.

Duquesne Spy Ring

Two German spies, Franz Joseph Stigler and Erwin Wilhelm Siegler, were members of its crew in 1941. While on the America, they obtained information about the movement of ships and military defense preparations at the Panama Canal, observed and reported defense preparations in the Canal Zone, and met with other German agents to advise them in their espionage efforts. They operated as couriers transmitting information between the United States and German agents aboard. Stigler worked undercover as chief butcher. Both remained on the America until its conversion by the Navy into a troop transport and its commission into the U.S. Navy as the USS West Point.

Stigler and Siegler, along with the 31 other German agents of the Duquesne Spy Ring, were later uncovered by the FBI in the largest espionage conviction in U.S. history.

Upon conviction, Stigler was sentenced to serve 16 years in prison on espionage charges with two concurrent years for registration violations; Siegler was sentenced to 10 years' imprisonment on espionage charges and a concurrent two-year term for violation of the Foreign Agents Registration Act.

US Navy service (1941–1946)

1941

America was moored at Norfolk, Virginia, and acquired by the Navy on 1 June 1941 to be used as a troop transport. The ship was renamed the USS West Point (AP-23), the second U.S. Navy ship of the name. It entered the Norfolk Ship Yards on 6 June 1941 for conversion and on 15 June 1941, it was commissioned for service under the command of Captain Frank H. Kelley, Jr.

By the time the conversion was completed, life-rafts covered the promenade deck windows, "standee" bunks could be found everywhere, several anti-aircraft weapons were installed, all of the windows were covered, the ship was painted in a camouflage gray color, and the troop-carrying capacity was increased to 7,678.

The USS West Point soon proceeded to New York City and, while anchored off the Staten Island quarantine station on 16 July, took on board 137 Italian citizens and 327 German citizens from the consulates of those nations in the United States which had been closed. West Point got under way at 2:55 that afternoon, bound for Portugal, and arrived at Lisbon on 23 July.

While there, the ship was visited by Portuguese naval and diplomatic dignitaries; and it transferred supplies to the Coast Guard cutter , the "station ship" at Lisbon, Portugal. After its final Italian passenger had disembarked on 23 July, and the last German on 24 July, West Point commenced taking on 321 American citizens and 67 Chinese—consular staffs and their families – on 26 July.

Returning to New York on 1 August, West Point discharged its passengers and headed south for an overhaul at Portsmouth, Virginia.

The Preamble to Convoy WS-12X   

The Atlantic Conference was held on 9 August 1941 in Placentia Bay, Newfoundland, between Prime Minister Winston Churchill and President Roosevelt. Besides the "official" agenda, Churchill hoped to obtain considerable assistance from the USA, but the American President had his political hands tied. On 1 September 1941, Roosevelt received an urgent and most secret message asking for US Navy troopships manned by Navy crews and escorted by U.S.N. fighting ships to carry British troops for the purpose of reinforcing the Middle East. On 4 September the US destroyer, USS Greer (DD-145), came under an unsuccessful U-boat attack. Roosevelt gave authority to the US Navy to "shoot to kill". On 5 September the President assured the British leader that six vessels would be provided to carry twenty thousand troops and would be escorted by the American Navy.
                            
The chief of Naval Operations ordered troop ships divisions seventeen and nineteen, on 26 September 1941, to prepare their vessels for approximately six months at sea. These transports were to load to capacity with food, ammunition medical supplies, fuel and water and were to arrive at Halifax, NS on or about 6 November and after the arrival of a British convoy from the UK were to load twenty thousand troops. The Prime Minister mentioned in his letter that it would be for the President to say what would be required in replacement if any of these ships were to be sunk by enemy action. Agreements were worked out for the troops to be carried as supernumeraries and rations to be paid out of Lend Lease Funds and officer laundry bills were to be paid in cash. All replenishments of provisions, general stores, fuel and water would be provided by the UK. Fuel and water would be charged for the escorts to the UK in Trinidad and Cape Town only. The troops would conform to US Navy and ships regulation. Intoxicating liquors were prohibited. It was further agreed that the troops were to rig and man their own anti-aircraft guns to augment the ships batteries.

Convoy William Sail WS-12X 

On 3 November, it sailed from Virginia waters and arrived at Halifax, Nova Scotia, on 5 November. There, on 8 & 9 November, it embarked 241 officers and 5,202 men of the 55th Brigade, Bedfordshire and Hertfordshire Regiment, and 100 men of a US Army Field Service company. On 10 November, West Point – in company with five other transports: Wakefield, Mount Vernon, and  – got under way for India as Convoy HS-124.

 
On 17 November 1941, Convoy WS12-X reaches Trinidad. All ships were replenished, and the convoy departs Trinidad on 19 November 1941.

On 7 December at 2000, the convoy receives a radio communication of the Japanese attack on Pearl Harbor. 

On 9 December, convoy WS12-X arrived in Cape Town, South Africa. 

At about 0800 on 13 December 1941, the troopships departed Cape Town headed for Bombay.
 

Wakefield commenced discharging its embarked troops at 1900 at the Ballard Piers, completed her unloading, and shifted berths the next morning. West Point took Wakefield'''s former berth while Joseph T. Dickman moored to unload its equipment and troops.

1942

Convoy BM 11
Having completed its discharge by 31 December 1941, West Point anchored in the stream on the morning of 2 January 1942 and awaited further orders until 4 January, when British authorities asked Captain Kelley, of West Point, if his ship and Wakefield could be brought under  draught to make passage for Singapore. Kelley responded that it could be done, but this would entail discharging ballast and expelling some of the ship's fresh water supply—thus endangering the ship's stability.

Due to prevailing low-water conditions at Bombay at this point, neither West Point nor Wakefield could go alongside piers in the harbor to either load equipment or troops. Thus, the embarkation and loading procedures had to be carried out by the tedious process of embarking troops and loading supplies from smaller ships and lighters brought alongside. Wakefield embarked – almost to a man – the troops which it had brought from Halifax, a total of 4,506, while West Point embarked two-thirds of the troops which it had transported, in addition to some which had come out on other ships. All told, it carried some 5,272 men.West Point sailed for Singapore on 9 January, in a "15-knot" convoy, with Captain Kelley as the convoy commodore. In addition to the two American ships, three British transports – Duchess of Bedford, and  – made up the remainder of the van. Escorted by British light cruiser  until this ship was relieved by light cruiser  at 1630 on 22 January, the convoy's escort soon swelled to three cruisers and four destroyers as the convoy neared Java. Japanese submarine activities near the Indonesian archipelago prompted concern for the safe arrival of the valuable ships, hence a  detour through the shallow, coral-studded Sunda Strait.

An escorting destroyer steamed between each transport, as they steamed in single-column order. It was a dangerous passing, a small divergence from the charted course could mean a disastrous grounding.

Proceeding to Singapore via Berhala Strait, Durian Strait, and Philips Channel, the group steamed through these bodies of water in bright moonlight which made navigational aids unnecessary. Upon their arrival off Singapore, the ships lay to in an exposed position, beyond the range of shore-based antiaircraft guns, until pilots could be obtained to bring the ships in. Since the naval base came under daily heavy air raids, the transports proceeded to Keppel Harbor, the commercial basin at Singapore, where they could discharge their troops and cargo.

Singapore

Securing abreast godowns (warehouses) 52, 53, and 54, West Point commenced off-loading equipment and disembarking its troops. All but 670 engineer troops, who had been ordered retained on board, were ashore before nightfall. Air raids, meanwhile, continued until midnight as the Japanese steadily pounded Singapore from the air. At each alert, the local workers working dockside would vanish, taking to the shelters and leaving the vital cargo still unloaded. As a result, the unloading was carried out by the crew of West Point, its embarked troops, and 22 local workers who were brought aboard to assist.

On 30 January, seven Japanese bombers appeared over the city and were engaged by British Brewster Buffalo fighters. As the alert continued, 30 more Japanese planes appeared overhead, on course over Keppel Harbor. Several bombs fell on shore, eastward of West Point's moorings, while another stick fell in the water to the southward. In the interim, bombs hit other targets. A small tanker moored near Wakefield was sunk at dockside; bombs fell abreast Empress of Japan; and Wakefield took a direct hit forward which destroyed its sick bay, killed five men and wounded nine. The last bombs in this stick straddled West Point and showered her with shrapnel. As the raid lifted, West Point sent two medical officers and 11 corpsmen on board Wakefield, at the latter's request, to render medical assistance.

Later that morning, Captain Kelley attended a conference with British authorities, who informed him that his ship was to be used to carry a contingent of Australian troops from Suez to Singapore and to transport refugees and evacuees to Ceylon. With the emergency "acute", Kelley agreed to take on board up to one thousand women and children and such additional men as the British desired to send. With the abandonment of the naval dockyard, untenable in the face of increasingly heavier Japanese bombardments from artillery and aircraft, several dockyard naval and civilian personnel and their families were assigned to West Point for evacuation. Most carried only hand baggage; had little, if any, money; but were all fortunate enough to escape the doomed city before its fall to the onrushing Japanese troops of General Yamashita. All told, some 1,276 naval officers, their families, dockyard civilians, civilian evacuees, a 16-man Royal Air Force (RAF) contingent, and 225 naval ratings made up the 1,276 people embarked by 6:00 p.m. on 30 January.

Clearing Singapore, West Point and Wakefield headed due west, escorted by HMS Durban. Overcast and squally weather covered their departure and permitted them to transit the Banka Strait unmolested by the seemingly omnipresent Japanese aircraft. Routed to Batavia, Java, to embark more refugees, West Point led Wakefield and Durban through the minefields and anchored in Batavia Roads at 3:05 a.m. on 31 January. HMS Electra—which would be lost in the Battle of the Java Sea 27 February—came alongside eight hours later and transferred 20 naval dockyard personnel, three women, five naval officers' wives, one Free French officer, and an RAF officer to West Point for passage to Ceylon.

February 1942 to end of 1942 

At 12:40 pm on 1 February, West Point—in company with Wakefield and under escort of Exeter, HMS Encounter, and —got under way. The destroyers eventually went off to perform other duties, and Exeter as well soon dropped away to escort another convoy, leaving the two big troopships on their own. While they were en route, disconcerting news came over the radio. Japanese I-boats (identified after the war as I-162 and I-153) had been active in the vicinity, sinking six ships between them. West Point acquired an extra passenger while en route; for, on 4 February, a baby boy was born on board.

Colombo Harbor, Ceylon, where they arrived on 6 February, was so crowded that British authorities could not permit Wakefield to repair its damage there. The passengers, in turn, experienced much difficulty in arranging for suitable transportation ashore. In addition, neither transport could fully provision.

British authorities requested the American ships to evacuate personnel to Bombay. Accordingly, West Point took on board eight men, 55 women, and 53 children, as well as 670 troops, for passage to India. Wakefield, despite its weakened condition caused by the direct hit on 29 January, embarked two naval ratings, six RAF personnel, and 25 men and one officer of a British Bofors gun detachment. Captain Kelley later highly praised the operations of this sole escort. Although heavy weather was encountered en route, the Greek destroyer acquitted itself well, continuing to patrol its station "at all times at high speed ahead of our zig-zag."

After discharging her evacuees at Bombay, West Point parted company with Wakefield and proceeded to Suez where she picked up Australian troops who were being withdrawn from the North African Campaign to fight the Japanese in Southeast Asia. Meanwhile, one disaster after another had plagued the Allied forces. Singapore fell on 15 February; Java on 4 March. West Point carried its embarked troops to Australia and disembarked them at Adelaide and Melbourne before heading across the Pacific toward San Francisco.

As the Allies built up for the long road back, West Point participated in the effort to aid America's allies in the southwest Pacific with massive contingents of troops. Accordingly, the transport carried men to Wellington, New Zealand, and arrived on 30 May. There, it received orders to return to New York; and it got under way from Melbourne on 8 June, bound for the Panama Canal. It entered the Atlantic on 26 June, and arrived at New York on 2 July.

After two voyages to the United Kingdom, West Point sailed for India, via the South Atlantic route, and arrived at Bombay on 29 November, before pushing on for Auckland, New Zealand, the following month.

1943
The transport returned via Nouméa, New Caledonia, to San Francisco on 31 January 1943. It remained on the West Coast until 16 February, when it got under way for the South Pacific and retraced its route to Wellington, New Zealand, and Australian ports. It then continued west—calling at Bombay, Massawa, Aden, and Suez—and stopped briefly at Cape Town en route to Rio de Janeiro, Brazil. Eventually arriving at New York on 4 May, the ship subsequently made two voyages to Casablanca, French Morocco before sailing for Bombay via the southern Atlantic route. Calling at Rio de Janeiro and Cape Town en route, the big transport continued, via Bombay and Melbourne, on for the West Coast of the United States.

Soon thereafter, West Point began transporting troops to Australia and continued making voyages there and to Allied bases in the Central and South Pacific through the end of 1943.

1944
In 1944, the transport continued its vital workhorse duties, departing San Francisco on 12 January, bound for Nouméa and Guadalcanal; and from San Pedro, California on 22 February, bound for Nouméa and Milne Bay. It sailed from the latter port and steamed via the Panama Canal to Boston, Massachusetts, where it arrived on 12 June. It conducted five successive voyages to the United Kingdom before departing Boston on 6 December 1944 for Oran, Algeria; Casablanca, French Morocco; and Marseille, France. The transport left the Mediterranean on 26 December and proceeded to Norfolk, Virginia.

1945–1946

In 1945, West Point voyaged to Italian and French ports, via Oran or Gibraltar, staging from Hampton Roads, Virginia, Boston, or New York. After Germany surrendered, it took part in some of the initial "Magic Carpet" voyages, bringing home American troops from the European battlefronts. Following its last European voyage—to Le Havre, France—West Point was transferred to the Pacific Fleet. It departed Boston on 10 December 1945, transited the Panama Canal, and proceeded to Manila, Philippines via Pearl Harbor. Retracing the same route, it docked at pier 88 in New York on 7 February 1946 and soon got under way for Hampton Roads, where it was released from troop-carrying service on 22 February.

Its last voyage under the name West Point was a short trip from Portsmouth to Newport News for reconversion to a passenger liner. There, six days later, it was officially decommissioned, stricken from the Naval Vessel Register on 12 March, and transferred to the Maritime Commission's War Shipping Administration.

During its naval service, it carried a total of over 350,000 troops which was the largest total of any Navy troopship in service during World War II. On one voyage in 1944 it was able to transport 9,305 people. Additionally the troop transport carried Red Cross workers, United Nations officials, children, civilians, prisoners of war, and U.S.O. entertainers.

Awards

During its service in the U.S. Navy, West Point earned the following awards:

American Defense Service Medal
European-African-Middle Eastern Campaign Medal
Asiatic-Pacific Campaign Medal
World War II Victory Medal

Postwar career
United States Lines career (1946–1964)America's postwar career was successful, if uneventful. Finally, it was able to sail the New York–Le Havre–Bremerhaven–Cobh route that had been delayed by World War II.

After 1955, it continued to sail the US-Europe route through at least 1960, but also served tropical ports such as Bermuda and the Caribbean. It sailed on fourteen trans-Atlantic voyages in 1962, and eight in 1963, but was laid up in Hoboken for five months starting in September, 1963 as a result of industrial action.

Chandris line career (1964–1978)America was sold to the Greek-owned Chandris Group on 16 November 1964. At twenty-four, it was getting older and facing competition from both newer, faster ships and long-range, even non-stop, air travel. The postwar emigrant run from Europe to Australia had become a lucrative market for passenger ships unable to court the luxury trade.America, now renamed Australis (meaning "Australia", following the naming convention of Chandris liners), was refitted extensively. Some 350 additional cabins were installed and many existing cabins were given extra berths, increasing the passenger capacity from fewer than 1,200 to 2,258.

Its maiden voyage was from Southampton on 21 August 1965 to Australia and New Zealand via Piraeus and Suez, returning to Southampton via the Pacific and Panama and Miami. Thereafter it sailed regularly from Southampton, occasionally Rotterdam, on this round-the-world route. On the closure of the Suez Canal in 1967, Piraeus was dropped as a port-of-call and it sailed southbound via Cape Town.

On 22 October 1970, fire broke out in the galley, causing the air-conditioning supply units and exhaust systems to be cut off from the bridge and "B" deck port about 3:45 a.m. It was extinguished the following day, but the voyage was delayed due to repair work.

On 11 July 1974, Australis was involved in a minor collision with the Australian aircraft carrier  while in Sydney Harbour. Both ships were slightly damaged, but there were no casualties.

It was the last liner providing a regular service to Australia and New Zealand from Southampton until its final voyage, which left on 18 November 1977. After arriving at Auckland, she was laid up at Timaru on 23 December 1977.

Ultimately, rising fuel costs, aging infrastructure, and the creation of long-range jetliners caused Chandris to pull Australis off the Australian run in 1978.

Venture Cruise Lines career (June 1978 – August 1978)

Following a period of layup in Timaru, New Zealand, Australis was sold to Venture Cruise Lines of New York. Under this new ownership, the ship was renamed America once again in an attempt to capitalize on its American heritage despite being registered as a Greek vessel. The ship's hull was painted dark blue and the funnels were repainted in a blue-and-red color scheme.America set sail on her first cruise on 30 June 1978. Its refit, however, had not been completed by the time of the sailing. The ship was in an extremely bad condition, with piles of soiled linen, worn mattresses, and scattered piles of trash everywhere, together with a pungent smell of kitchen odors, engine oil, and the sounds of plumbing back-ups.

In addition, water in overhead pipes leaked and dripped all over the decks. Along with these many maintenance issues, attempts to spruce the ship up led to other problems, such as the many layers of paint visible on the ship's outer bulkheads as well as on the lifeboat davits and gear. Additionally, the public rooms aboard were carelessly repainted, as seen from how the America's stainless-steel trims were then scarred with paint-brush strokes.

Due to overbooking and her state of incompletion, a number of passengers "mutinied," forcing the captain to return to New York, having only barely passed the Statue of Liberty. Nine hundred-sixty passengers were offloaded upon docking. On a second sailing that day, an additional 200 passengers left via tender at Staten Island.America finally left for a five-day cruise to Nova Scotia on 3 July 1978. Upon arrival, she was met with $2.5 million in claims from passengers. Further issues saw the cancellation of all further sailings, and America was impounded on 18 July 1978 for non-payment of debts. America also received an inspection score of six out of a possible 100 points by the US Public Health Service.

On 28 August 1978, America was ordered to be sold at auction by the United States district court.

Second Chandris career (1978–1980)

Chandris Lines repurchased America for $1,000,000 and renamed her Italis. Her forward dummy funnel had become severely corroded due to years of neglect and was removed as part of an ambitious plan to modernize her silhouette by adding streamlined superstructure above the bridge, but this 'new look' was never completed. She retained the dark blue hull adopted by Venture Cruise Lines.Italis first operated under Chandris as a hotel ship from 23 June - 20 July 1979 when it was chartered for the Organisation of African Unity Conference held in Monrovia, Liberia. It then carried out three 14-night cruises from Genoa and Barcelona to Egypt, Israel and the Eastern Mediterranean beginning on 28 July 1979. At the end of this series of cruises it was finally laid up in Elefsina Bay, Piraeus, Greece on 12 September 1979.

Uncertain future at Piraeus (1979–1993)

The ship was next sold to Intercommerce Corporation in 1980, and was renamed Noga. Intercommerce's intention was to convert the ship to a prison ship, to be anchored in Beirut; but this never happened.

In September, 1984, the ship was sold to Silver Moon Ferries and was once again renamed, now carrying the name Alferdoss (meaning "paradise" in Arabic). However, the new name was not completely added (since the port bow was only renamed Alferdoss), so the name on the stern and starboard bow continued to show Noga.

While under the ownership of Silver Moon Ferries, a burst bilge pipe led to flooding in the engine room and some crew quarters. Due to the quickly-occurring list, the starboard anchor was raised and her port anchor was cut away, and it was quickly beached to prevent sinking. After being pumped out and repaired, it was returned to its original location.

In the late 1980s, the ship was sold for $2 million for scrapping. The scrap merchant made an initial deposit of $1 million, and began work. Following the demolition of the lifeboats and lifeboat davits, the scrappers defaulted on payments, and pulled out.Alferdoss/Noga would continue in this state until 1993.

Wrecked at Fuerteventura and break up (1994–2008)
In October, 1992, the ship was sold yet again, with the intention of being refitted to become a five-star hotel ship off Phuket, in Thailand. Drydocking at that time revealed that, despite the years of neglect, the hull was still in remarkably good condition. In August, 1993, it was renamed American Star, her propellers were removed and placed on the deck at the bow, the funnel was painted red, the bridge was painted signal orange just for the tow, and ladders were welded to starboard. Since the vessel was not allowed to pass through the Suez Canal due to its age, the vessel had to go around the Cape of Good Hope in order to get to Thailand.

The ship left Greece under tow on 22 December 1993, but the tow proved impossible due to inclement weather. It then returned to Greece for a few days until the weather calmed down. On 31 December 1993, American Star left Greece for the last time, under tow by Ukrainian tugboat Neftegaz-67.

The hundred-day tow began. Shortly afterward, American Star and Neftegaz-67 sailed into a thunderstorm in the Atlantic. The tow-lines broke and six or more crew members were sent aboard the American Star to reattach the emergency tow-lines, which proved unsuccessful. Two other towboats were called to assist Neftegaz 67. On 17 January 1994, the crew aboard American Star was rescued by helicopter. The ship was left adrift. At 6:15 a.m. on 18 January, the ship went aground at Playa de Garcey, off the west coast of Fuerteventura in the Canary Islands.

While discussions among the ship's owners, the towing firm, and the companies insuring the ship were going on, the ship was left to nature, with the forward part going aground on a sandbar. Within the first 48 hours of grounding, the pounding surf of the Atlantic broke the ship in two just past the second funnel. The ship was declared a total loss on 6 July 1994. The  stern section collapsed completely to port and sank in 1996, while the  bow section remained intact. As months passed after running ashore, the wreck attracted onlookers and even looters. Locals even created a zipline to the wreck to carry off anything valuable from it. Due to the rough waves and strong current, trying to reach the wreck was very unsafe. Over the years several people trying to swim out to the wreck had died while others had to be airlifted off once they got on board. Those that have gotten onboard showed views of the interiors and exteriors of the wreck such as sparse cabins and water crashing through the blown-out portholes. The only other documentation came from a German documentary in 1999 that showed the interiors and exteriors of the wreck, including rare views filmed just after the stern section had split apart. As part of an art project, the film crew brought generators and floodlights aboard to illuminate the bow section.

By 2004 the bow section continued to remain upright with the water eroding away cargo hold no. 1, making the bow section extremely top heavy. In November, 2005, the port side of the bow section collapsed, which caused the liner's remains to assume a much sharper list, and the remaining funnel detached and fell into the ocean. The collapse of the port side also caused the hull to begin to break up and by October, 2006, the wreck had almost completely collapsed onto its port side.

In April, 2007, the starboard side finally collapsed, causing the wreck to break in half and fall into the sea.

Debris Field (2008 – present)

It was noted in 2013 that the wreck was no longer visible on Google Maps. By 2018, only the bow was left visible, and only during low tide.

In 2019, extensive underwater footage was taken of the American Stars debris field by scuba divers during a period of calm seas.  While the liner's hull and superstructure are now fully disintegrated, there remain recognizable chunks of the vessel half buried in the sand. Anchor chains on the forecastle and a boiler are particularly intact. The detached funnel is also intact. The wreck site is teeming with marine life.

 See also 
, fleetmate of the America''

References

Further reading 
 Miller, W. (1991). SS United States : The story of America's greatest ocean liner . New York, NY: W.W. Norton.
 Driscoll, Lawrence. (2003) S.S. America U.S.S. West Point S.S. Australis The Many Lives of a Great Ship Palo Alto The Glencannon Press
"S. S. America — An All American Liner" Article on construction with photos.
"Radio Installation on America" First radio installation specifically designed for a ship before keel laying.

External links

 Darren Byrne's SS Australis site
Larry Driscoll's SS America site
 The S. S. Australis Homepage
 Interior images taken in 1993
 The Great Ocean Liners on SS America 
 LostLiners.com on the SS America
 Original article on how to get to the wreck of the American Star. Also in German and Spanish
 How to get to the wreck of the American Star
 American-Star.de > German and English page, extensive coverage and pictures of the wreck
 Google Earth historical imagery

1939 ships
Type P4 ships
Ocean liners
Steamships of the United States
Passenger ships of the United States
Troop ships of the United States
Steamships of Greece
Passenger ships of Greece
Ships of the United States Lines
Steamships of Panama
Passenger ships of Panama
Shipwrecks in the Atlantic Ocean
Maritime incidents in 1994
Maritime incidents in Spain
Ships built in Newport News, Virginia